Knust is a surname of German origin. Notable people with the surname include:

Juliana Knust (born 1981), Brazilian actress
Peter Knust (born 1960), German swimmer

References

Surnames of German origin